Payar Island is an island in Kedah, Malaysia. Payar Island status as a marine park offers protection for its diverse marine life. Payar Island is also a snorkelling and diving site famous for its corals.

The marine park teems with a diversity of marine life and vegetation.

Many endangered species of fishes and marine organisms live within the sanctuary. Measuring 2 km long and 1/4 km wide, Payar Island is the most popular of the islands as its sheltered waters are ideal are for snorkelling, diving and swimming. Among the dive spots is the "Coral Garden", an area covered with bright, multi-hued soft corals.

There are several sandy beaches on Payar island as well as hiking trails. Just off the beach, tourists feed baby sharks. Tourist infrastructure has been installed by the local authorities.

Boat services link Kuah to the island.

Coral Bleaching

Due to excessive carrying capacity and persistently extreme sea water temperatures, the Payar Island Marine Park suffered from widespread coral bleaching at a critical level in the second half of 2010. Furthermore, marine life density around the area has been recorded to be significantly lesser compared to previous years. In response, the Department of Marine Park Kedah has closed the affected areas in order to minimize human aggravated stress on the corals.

The mass bleaching became even more severe by 2016 due to the prolonged El Nino phenomenon which started in mid 2015 affecting more than half the reefs in Thailand and Peninsular Malaysian waters.

References

External links 

 Tourism Malaysia - Payar Island Marine Park

Islands of Kedah